Buck Rogers in the 25th Century is a 1979 American science fiction adventure film directed by Daniel Haller. Starring Gil Gerard in the title role and Erin Gray as Colonel Wilma Deering, it was produced by Glen A. Larson who co-wrote the screenplay with Leslie Stevens, based on the character Buck Rogers which was created by Philip Francis Nowlan in 1928. It was originally made as a television pilot, but Universal Pictures opted to release the movie theatrically several months before the subsequent television series aired.

Plot
In 1987, NASA astronaut Captain William "Buck" Rogers is piloting the space shuttle Ranger 3 when he flies into an unexpected space phenomenon and is frozen for 504 years. In the year 2491, his shuttle is found drifting in space by the alien flagship Draconia, which is headed to Earth for a trade conference, under the command of Princess Ardala and her aide-de-camp, Kane, a former native of Earth. Rogers is revived from his cryogenic sleep and is questioned by the princess and Kane. Princess Ardala is visibly attracted to Buck, though Kane arranges for Buck to be placed back on his shuttle and returned towards Earth.

It turns out though the Draconians are actually planning to conquer the Earth through staged pirate attacks on Earth's shipping fleet, forcing Earth to seek a treaty with the Draconians and unwittingly opening up their defenses to the invaders. They plant a homing beacon aboard Buck's shuttle to track a way through Earth's planet-wide defense shield. Buck is escorted through the defense shield by Colonel Wilma Deering of Earth's military forces. He lands in the futuristic city of New Chicago where he is interrogated and learns that Earth has been rebuilt in the centuries during his absence following a nuclear holocaust, and now much of the Earth outside of the city is a desolate, radioactive wasteland. During his time in the city, Buck meets Dr. Elias Huer, the leader of Earth's Defense Directorate, the AI computer Dr. Theopolis, and the robot drone Twiki, most of whom attempt to help him adjust to his current surroundings.

While recounting his encounter with the Draconians, Buck notices several discrepancies and suspects that the Draconians must be armed, contrary to the terms of the trade meeting. Against advice, Buck ventures outside the city to the ruins of old Chicago in an attempt to see that what he has been told is real, eventually finding his own parents' grave and having to be rescued by Wilma and her troops from the violent mutants inhabiting the ruins. Following Buck's return to the Inner City, the Draconian tracking device is found aboard his ship, and the authorities accuse Buck of espionage and sentence him to death. Buck claims the Draconians simply used him, and Wilma persuades Dr. Huer to test Buck's claims by requesting a meeting with Princess Ardala and Kane aboard the Draconia. During the meeting, the pirate ships (actually Draconian marauders) attack their flagship as a diversion, but Buck manages to destroy them single-handedly, thus earning Wilma's respect.

At the official diplomatic reception on Earth, Ardala, who is still attracted to Buck, invites him back to the Draconia later that night. Buck uses the invitation to go aboard and find out the truth behind the Draconians' scheme. On the ship, Ardala informs Buck she needs a man such as him to rule by her side and offers him the position. After drugging Ardala, Buck explores the ship and discovers their marauders and imminent plans to attack Earth. Dr. Theopolis and Twiki, who have followed Buck aboard, eventually meet up with him and alert Earth to the Draconian invasion. Wilma immediately scrambles Earth's starfighters and attacks the Draconia, while Buck sabotages the Draconian marauder fleet prepared to attack Earth and fights off Ardala's bodyguard, Tigerman. During the battle, the Draconia is critically damaged, but Buck, Theopolis and Twiki are rescued by Wilma before the ship explodes. Ardala and Kane also escape the Draconias destruction in an escape shuttle, with Kane vowing to return to take his revenge on Buck.

Cast
 Gil Gerard as Captain William "Buck" Rogers
 Erin Gray as Colonel Wilma Deering
 Tim O'Connor as Dr. Elias Huer 
 Pamela Hensley as Princess Ardala
 Henry Silva as Kane
 Howard F. Flynn as Voice of Dr. Theopolis
 Felix Silla as Twiki
 Mel Blanc as Voice of Twiki
 Duke Butler as Tigerman
 Joseph Wiseman as Emperor Draco

Production
Inspired by the massive success of Star Wars the previous year, Universal began developing Buck Rogers for television, spearheaded by Glen A. Larson, who had a production deal with the studio. Initially, Larson and Universal had planned on making a series of Buck Rogers television movies for NBC. Production began in 1978, however, the pilot for Larson's other sci-fi series, Battlestar Galactica (1978), had been released theatrically in some countries and in key locations in North America, and had done well at the box office. Universal then opted to release the first Buck Rogers television movie theatrically on March 30, 1979. The movie grossed over $21 million in North America and was later released internationally, which led NBC to commission a weekly series, which began on September 20, 1979 with a slightly modified version of the theatrical release that deleted some scenes, added others intended to link to the ongoing series, revised the fate of one character killed off in the original so that he survived (Tigerman, who, in the movie was incinerated off camera by an exploding bomb), and replaced the suggestive opening credit sequence with a more generic version.

The movie was originally slated for release for September 1978. There were several start dates for filming, but it was repeatedly delayed due to casting problems. The movie was eventually released in March 1979.

Several shots in the movie were filmed at the Westin Bonaventure Hotel in Los Angeles, California. Several other stock shots portraying futuristic buildings on Earth are that of remaining pavilions on the site of Expo 67, including the British and French national pavilion (now open as the Montreal Casino). These shots were also included in the Battlestar Galactica episode "Greetings from Earth" (1979), in which they were said to be a city on the planet Paradeen (though in production around the same time, the episode aired a month before the release of the Buck Rogers film). Buck's NASA shuttle, Ranger 3, was itself a prop that had been seen in this same episode where it was used as Michael's Lunar-7 shuttle though painted a different color.

Princess Ardala's father, Emperor Draco (played by Joseph Wiseman), originally had several scenes in the movie but most of these were deleted. His only remaining scene was as a holographic image reprimanding Kane at the movie's ending. Despite this brief appearance, images of Draco appeared prominently in various Buck Rogers merchandise, and 12" and 3¾" Draco action figures were produced by the toy company Mego. Wiseman would later appear in the weekly television series, playing the character Carl Morphus in the episode "Vegas in Space" (1979).

Soundtrack
The movie's opening credits featured a song, "Suspension", sung by Kipp Lennon and co-written by Glen A. Larson. An instrumental version of the song was used as the main theme for the television series that followed, though the vocal version of the song was used again for the ending credits of the season one finale "Flight of the War Witch" (1980).

Reception
The movie received a mixed reception from critics.

The movie opened in the United States and Canada in 935 theaters and grossed $4,579,500 in its opening weekend. It expanded the following weekend to 1,405 theaters, grossing $10,576,452 in its first 10 days.

Home media
The movie has been released on video several times since the 1980s, and was released on DVD in the Buck Rogers in the 25th Century series boxed set released on November 16, 2004. This was in lieu of the television broadcast version (entitled "Awakening") which contained some different scenes. When the first season was issued again on DVD on January 24, 2012, the boxed set still contained the theatrical version of the movie. However, the television version of the movie was finally released on DVD as a bonus feature in a reissued boxed set of Season Two on January 8, 2013. Kino Lorber released a single-disc Blu-ray of the theatrical cut on November 24, 2020, featuring a new 2K master and finally preserving the movie's original 1.85:1 aspect ratio.

References

External links
  (1979 film)
 
 
 

1979 films
1970s American films
1970s English-language films
1970s science fiction adventure films
American dystopian films
American post-apocalyptic films
American science fiction adventure films
American space adventure films
American space opera films
American television series premieres
Buck Rogers
Films based on comic strips
Films directed by Daniel Haller
Films scored by Stu Phillips
Films set in 1987
Films set in the 25th century
Films set in Chicago
Films set in the future
Films shot in Los Angeles
Television films as pilots
Universal Pictures films